The Indonesian Aerospace N-219 Nurtanio is a utility aircraft developed from the CASA C-212 Aviocar by Indonesian Aerospace.

Development 

In 2003, after the IPTN N-250 program halt, Indonesian Aerospace (IAe) planned to develop a 19-seat aircraft to offset the IPTN NC-212 end of production.

In early 2004, IAe was in discussions with Malaysian aerospace companies and was estimating the N219 development at $60–80 million to fly a prototype in April 2006 and certify it in August 2007.

In 2006, the $65m funding for the 19 seat N-219 development was proposed under the Qatar-Indonesia Joint Investment Fund,  70% funded by Qatar and 30% by Indonesia, for a prototype within two years.

By June 2011, its price was forecast to be US$4 million each and it was expected to fly in 2014. The Indonesian Industry Minister requested Rp59 billion to build the prototype.

In January 2012, the predicted development budget was about $30 million for 15 aircraft.

In August 2014, the forecast price rose to $5 million.

The first metal was cut in September 2014, before a planned roll-out in August 2015 and certification in 2016, before EASA certification with support from Airbus for export. First deliveries were scheduled for 2017.

The roll-out was then scheduled in November 2015.

In August 2016, Airbus was engaged to provide assistance with certification.

The prototype entered testing after the November 2015 public introduction. The first prototype construction was planned to be completed in mid-2016 for a maiden flight at the end of 2016, but this first flight was delayed to March 2017 for certification in the same year and production start in 2018. In February, it was delayed again to April.

After a series of high-speed taxiing runs on 11 August 2017 at Husein Sastranegara International Airport in Bandung, the prototype took off on 16 August 2017 for a 26-minute flight. At that time it was estimated that at least Rp 200 billion was needed to complete 200 hours of flight tests for certification from the Indonesian Transport Ministry.

Production was forecast in 2019 to start with six aircraft, increasing to 16 in 2020 and 36 per year in a new  $90–100 million facility raised through equity participation, private-public partnerships, manufacturing subsidiaries, and joint ventures.

The Indonesian Directorate General of Civil Aviation issued a type certificate on 18 December 2020.

Design
The N-219 is twin-engine, 19-seater transport aircraft designed for multi-purpose missions in remote areas.
It is intended to operate in and out of remote, semi-prepared airstrips; suitable to conditions in Indonesia's archipelago.

It was developed from the CASA C-212 Aviocar and, like that design, is also of all metal construction. It is claimed that it will have the largest cabin volume in its class (6.50 x 1.82 x 1.70m).
A flexible door system to allow a multi-purpose missions for transporting passengers and cargo. The aircraft is designed to comply with FAR 23 (commuter category aircraft).

Priced at $5.8-6 million, slightly lower than the Viking DHC-6 Twin Otter, the  cruise aircraft is intended for cargo and passenger transport, troop transport, military surveillance, search and rescue, and medevac operations, with a possible amphibian version later. Sixty percent of the materials are domestically produced and local suppliers produce landing gear parts, rubber components and tooling.

Orders
In August 2013, Lion Air was to sign a memorandum of understanding for 100 $4.5-5 million N219s. The total market for the N-219 was forecast as 97 civil and 57 military aircraft.

On 13 April 2015, three memoranda of understanding were signed: with Nusantara Buana Air for 20 aircraft and ten options, with Aviastar Mandiri for 20 aircraft and ten options and with Trigana Air Service for ten aircraft and five options.

Indonesia has signed deals with China and Mexico to export N-219 to those countries.

In 2017 southeast Asian countries such as Thailand and Myanmar expressed interest in the aircraft.

By October 2018, domestic airline Avistar signed a memorandum of understanding for 20 more while the N219 had 120 orders and was due to be certified in April or May 2019.

Other customers include Lion Air, Trigana Air Service, Nusantara Buana Air, Pelita Air, Air Born and the government of Thailand.

On 9 December 2019, the government of Aceh signed a cooperation agreement or memorandum of understanding for the procurement of N219 aircraft, crew training and the operation of Aceh's air transport swervice.

On 8 December 2021, a memorandum of understanding was signed by PT Dirgantara Indonesia (PTDI) and PT Infoglobal Teknologi Semesta/Infoglobal to integrate maritime surveillance aircraft (MSA) mission systems into the N219. It will be based on a previous system that also installed on the Navy's IPTN NC-212 Maritime Patrol aircraft.

On 3 November 2022, Indonesian company PT Karya Logistik Indotama (PT KLI) ordered 11 N-219s configured for passenger transport, for US$80.5M. The first aircraft are scheduled for delivery 28 months after the contract is signed.

Specifications

See also

References

External links

 

N-219
Aircraft first flown in 2017
2010s Indonesian airliners
High-wing aircraft
Twin-turboprop tractor aircraft